The M15 Makuti-Kariba Highway is a 2-way asphalt surface international highway from the A1 Highway at Makuti to Zambia via the Kariba Dam Wall.

It is also a primary road P12 Highway and part of Zimbabwean trunk road system.

Background

The M15 road was constructed at the same time with the Kariba Dam as an access road between Zambia and Zimbabwe through the dam wall. It is by all means a loop road to the Lusaka-Harare Highway. 
On the Zambian side it begins from a T-junction with the T2 Highway which runs from Lusaka to Chirundu.   
Here it is called the  Siavonga Road.
On the Zimbabwean side its begins from a junction with R3/A1 Highway which runs from Harare to Chirundu at Makuti.

For those not worried about crossing borders the M15 Highway is the shortest route from Chirundu, Zimbabwe to Kariba via Chirundu, Zambia and Siavonga. It is only 72 km, while the Chirundu, Zimbabwe to Kariba route via Makuti's 
144 km. 
From the Chirundu Border Post to the M15 Highway junction with Zambia's T2 Highway is 19 km, then 53 km to Kariba.

Operations

The Highway is tolled on either side of the dam wall. The Zimbabwe Revenue Authority and the Zambia Revenue Authority collects the tolls for using the dam wall but payable to the Zambezi River Authority.

Tourist to safari areas this side of the Kariba Dam use the M15 from Makuti. Those interested in marine life also use this highway to harbours at Kaeiba.

See also

 R3/A1 Highway 
 Chirundu-Beitbridge Regional Road Corridor 
 Transport in Zimbabwe

References 

Roads in Zimbabwe